Itete is an administrative ward in the Busokelo District of the Mbeya Region of Tanzania. In 2016 the Tanzania National Bureau of Statistics report there were 4,939 people in the ward, from 9,869 in 2012.

Villages / vitongoji 
The ward has 5 villages and 29 vitongoji.

 Kabembe
 Ikama
 Kitima
 Lwambi
 Mpanda
 Mpuguso
 Selya
 Bujesi
 Busekele
 Mbusania
 Ngana
 Busoka
 Butola
 Hedikota
 Juakali
 Kandete
 Katilu
 Mbegele
 Mbonja
 Mpanda
 Saru
 Kilugu
 Ipyana
 Lukwego
 Lupaso
 Lusungo
 Mpanda
 Ngamanga
 Kibole
 Ilopa
 Ipyasyo
 Kibole Kati
 Nguti
 Nkuyu

References 

Wards of Mbeya Region